The Lincoln County School District is a public school district based in Lincoln County, Mississippi (USA). The superintendent is Mickey Myers.

Schools
Bogue Chitto Attendance Center (Grades K-12)
Enterprise Attendance Center (Grades K-12) Web Site
Loyd Star Attendance Center (Grades K-12) Web Site
West Lincoln Attendance Center (Grades K-12) Web Site

Demographics

2006-07 school year
There were a total of 2,983 students enrolled in the Lincoln County School District during the 2006–2007 school year. The gender makeup of the district was 48% female and 52% male. The racial makeup of the district was 16.53% African American, 83.00% White, 0.23% Hispanic, 0.17% Asian, and 0.07% Native American. 38.0% of the district's students were eligible to receive free lunch.

Previous school years

Accountability statistics

See also
List of school districts in Mississippi

References

External links
Lincoln County School District

Education in Lincoln County, Mississippi
School districts in Mississippi